Ansoald was the bishop of Poitiers from 676 until about 696.

Ansoald was probably a Burgundian from the region around Autun. He inherited land from both his parents near Chalon-sur-Saône. In the second version of the Suffering of Leodegar, it is claimed that Ansoald was a relative of the martyred Leodegar. Although the second version of the Suffering was dedicated to Ansoald, it was probably composed in the middle of the 8th century by Ursinus, long after his death.

The Gesta Dagoberti, a late and legendary source, claims that Ansoald was passing through Sicily on a diplomatic mission when King Dagobert I died (639). The reported vision of a local hermit named John, supposedly told to Ansoald, describes Dagobert's narrow escape from Hell with the help of some saints.

After the return to power of the mayor of the palace Ebroin in 674 or 675, Ansoald hosted the exiled Philibert of Jumièges and helped him found the new . His lands at Chalon he donated to the new monastery. He also founded a xenodochium (hospice) for travellers. The Life of Eligius claims that Ansoald was close to the circle of followers of Columbanus.

According to the Deeds of the Bishops of Cambrai, Ansoald was at the royal palace when he learned of the miracles that followed the martyrdom of Leodegar. Probably around 681 or 682, he disputed the possession of the body of the martyr with Bishops Hermenar of Autun and Vindician of Cambrai. Ansoald won possession of the martyr through the drawing of lots. He had a church built to house the body at Saint-Maixent, which was probably dedicated on 30 October 684.

Ansoald rebuilt the church of Mazerolles. He has also been credited with the restoration work on the baptistery of Saint-Jean in Poitiers, which is the best preserved Merovingian structure in France.

Notes

Bibliography

7th-century births
690s deaths
Bishops of Poitiers